St Edmund's Church, Norwich is a Grade I listed redundant parish church in the Church of England in Norwich.

History

The church is medieval dating from the 13th century. The nave was restored in the 1860s  by Richard Phipson and the chancel by Ewan Christian.

After being declared redundant as a parish church, the building was used as a factory store. Later it was used as the Norwich Pregnancy Crisis centre.

Monuments

The church contains monuments to:
Thomas Stones (d. 1627)
Jeremiah Berry (d. 1767) by W. Lane of Norwich.

References

Edmund
Grade I listed buildings in Norfolk